Dalmanitoidea is a superfamily of trilobites in the order Phacopida, containing the three families Dalmanitidae, Diaphanometopidae and Prosopiscidae.

References

 
Phacopina
Arthropod superfamilies